The following outline is provided as an overview of and topical guide to the U.S. state of New Hampshire:

New Hampshire – U.S. state in the New England region of the United States of America, named after the southern English county of Hampshire.  It was one of the original thirteen states that founded the U.S.

General reference 

 Names
 Common name: New Hampshire
 Official name: State of New Hampshire
 Abbreviations and name codes
 Postal symbol:  NH
 ISO 3166-2 code:  US-NH
 Internet second-level domain:  .nh.us
 Nicknames
Granite State
White Mountain State
 Adjectival: New Hampshire
 Demonym: New Hampshirite

Geography of New Hampshire 

Geography of New Hampshire
 New Hampshire is: a U.S. state, a federal state of the United States of America
 Location:
 Northern hemisphere
 Western hemisphere
 Americas
 North America
 Anglo America
 Northern America
 United States of America
 Contiguous United States
 Canada–US border
 Eastern United States
 East Coast of the United States
 Northeastern United States
 New England
 Population of New Hampshire: 1,316,470  (2010 U.S. Census)
 Area of New Hampshire:
 Atlas of New Hampshire

Places in New Hampshire 

 Historic places in New Hampshire
 National Historic Landmarks in New Hampshire
 National Register of Historic Places listings in New Hampshire
 Bridges on the National Register of Historic Places in New Hampshire
 National Natural Landmarks in New Hampshire
 National parks in New Hampshire
 State parks in New Hampshire

Environment of New Hampshire 

 Climate of New Hampshire
 Protected areas in New Hampshire
 State forests of New Hampshire
 Superfund sites in New Hampshire

Natural geographic features of New Hampshire 

 Islands of New Hampshire
 Lakes of New Hampshire
 Mountains of New Hampshire
 Rivers of New Hampshire

Regions of New Hampshire 

 Central New Hampshire (Lakes Region)
 Northern New Hampshire
 Great North Woods Region
 White Mountains Region
 Southern New Hampshire
 Merrimack Valley Region
 Golden Triangle (New Hampshire)
 Southeastern New Hampshire (Seacoast Region)
 Southwestern New Hampshire (Monadnock Region)
 Western New Hampshire (Dartmouth-Lake Sunapee Region)
 Upper Valley

Administrative divisions of New Hampshire 

 The 10 counties of the state of New Hampshire
 Municipalities in New Hampshire
 Cities in New Hampshire
 State capital of New Hampshire: Concord
 City nicknames in New Hampshire
 Towns in New Hampshire

Demography of New Hampshire 

Demographics of New Hampshire

Government and politics of New Hampshire 

Politics of New Hampshire
 Form of government: U.S. state government
 United States congressional delegations from New Hampshire
 New Hampshire State Capitol
 Elections in New Hampshire
 Political party strength in New Hampshire

Branches of the government of New Hampshire 

Government of New Hampshire

Executive branch of the government of New Hampshire 
 Governor of New Hampshire
 Lieutenant Governor of New Hampshire
 Secretary of State of New Hampshire
 State departments
 New Hampshire Department of Transportation

Legislative branch of the government of New Hampshire 

 New Hampshire General Court (bicameral)
 Upper house: New Hampshire Senate
 Lower house: New Hampshire House of Representatives

Judicial branch of the government of New Hampshire 

Courts of New Hampshire
 Supreme Court of New Hampshire

Law and order in New Hampshire 

Law of New Hampshire
 Cannabis in New Hampshire
 Capital punishment  in New Hampshire
 Individuals executed in New Hampshire
 Constitution of New Hampshire
 Crime in New Hampshire
 Gun laws in New Hampshire
 Law enforcement in New Hampshire
 Law enforcement agencies in New Hampshire
 New Hampshire State Police
 Same-sex marriage in New Hampshire

Military in New Hampshire 

 New Hampshire Air National Guard
 New Hampshire Army National Guard

Local government in New Hampshire 

Local government in New Hampshire

History of New Hampshire 

History of New Hampshire

History of New Hampshire, by period 
 Prehistory of New Hampshire
Indigenous peoples
English Pannaway Plantation, 1623
English Colony of Massachusetts Bay, 1628–1686
English Province of New-Hampshire, 1680–1686
English Dominion of New-England in America, 1686–1689
English Province of New-Hampshire, 1689–1707
British Province of New-Hampshire, 1707–1776
King George's War, 1740–1748
Treaty of Aix-la-Chapelle of 1748
French and Indian War, 1754–1763
Treaty of Paris of 1763
British Indian Reserve, 1763–1783
Royal Proclamation of 1763
American Revolutionary War, April 19, 1775 – September 3, 1783
Treaty of Paris, September 3, 1783
State of New Hampshire, since 1776
Adopts constitution for an independent State of New Hampshire, January 5, 1776
United States Declaration of Independence, July 4, 1776
Seventh state to ratify the Articles of Confederation and Perpetual Union, signed July 9, 1778
Ninth State to ratify the Constitution of the United States of America on June 21, 1788
War of 1812, June 18, 1812 – March 23, 1815
Treaty of Ghent, December 24, 1814
Republic of Indian Stream, 1832–1835
Mexican–American War, April 25, 1846 – February 2, 1848
Franklin Pierce becomes 14th President of the United States on March 4, 1853
American Civil War, April 12, 1861 – May 13, 1865
New Hampshire in the American Civil War

History of New Hampshire, by region 

 By city
 History of Concord, New Hampshire
 History of Goffstown, New Hampshire
 History of Hanover, New Hampshire
 History of Portsmouth, New Hampshire

History of New Hampshire, by subject 
 Cannabis in New Hampshire
 History of capital punishment in New Hampshire
 History of education in New Hampshire
 History of the University of New Hampshire

Culture of New Hampshire 

Culture of New Hampshire
 Cuisine of New Hampshire
 Museums in New Hampshire
 Religion in New Hampshire
 Episcopal Diocese of New Hampshire
 Roman Catholic Diocese of Manchester
 Scouting in New Hampshire
 State symbols of New Hampshire
 Flag of the state of New Hampshire 
 Great Seal of the State of New Hampshire

The arts in New Hampshire 
 Music of New Hampshire

Sports in New Hampshire 

Sports in New Hampshire

Economy and infrastructure of New Hampshire 

Economy of New Hampshire
 Communications in New Hampshire
 Newspapers in New Hampshire
 Radio stations in New Hampshire
 Television stations in New Hampshire
 Energy in New Hampshire
 List of power stations in New Hampshire
 Solar power in New Hampshire
 Wind power in New Hampshire
 Health care in New Hampshire
 Hospitals in New Hampshire
 Transportation in New Hampshire
 Airports in New Hampshire
 Roads in New Hampshire
 State highways in New Hampshire

Education in New Hampshire 

Education in New Hampshire
 Schools in New Hampshire
 School districts in New Hampshire
 High schools in New Hampshire
 Colleges and universities in New Hampshire
 University of New Hampshire

See also

Topic overview:
New Hampshire

Index of New Hampshire-related articles

References

External links 

New Hampshire
New Hampshire